The Originals, a one-hour American supernatural drama, was renewed for a fourth season by The CW on March 17, 2016, by The CW's President, Mark Pedowitz. The 2016–17 United States television season debut of The Originals was pushed to midseason, which saw the fourth-season premiere on March 17, 2017. It concluded on June 23, 2017, after 13 episodes.

Cast

Main
 Joseph Morgan as Klaus Mikaelson (himself; possessed by the Hollow)
 Daniel Gillies as Elijah Mikaelson (himself; possessed by the Hollow)
 Phoebe Tonkin as Hayley Marshall
 Charles Michael Davis as Marcel Gerard (himself; possessed by the Hollow)
 Yusuf Gatewood as Vincent Griffith
 Riley Voelkel as Freya Mikaelson

Recurring
 Steven Krueger as Josh Rosza
 Taylor Cole as Sofya Voronova (herself; possessed by the Hollow)
 Debra Mooney as Mary Dumas
 Christina Moses as Keelin
 Summer Fontana as Hope Mikaelson (herself; possessed by the Hollow)
 Alkoya Brunson as Adam Folsom
 Karan Kendrick as Maxine Folsom
 Nathaniel Buzolic as Kol Mikaelson
 Jason Dohring as Will Kinney
 Darri Ingolfsson as Dominic
 Blu Hunt as Inadu / the Hollow
 Madelyn Cline as Jessica
 Najah Jackson as Amy

Special guest
 Claire Holt as Rebekah Mikaelson
 Leah Pipes as Cami O'Connell
 Danielle Campbell as Davina Claire
 Matt Davis as Alaric Saltzman

Guest
 Neil Jackson as Alistair Duquesne
 Keahu Kahuanui as Eddie
 Maisie Richardson-Sellers as Eva Sinclair
 Lyndon Smith as Lara
 Sebastian Roché as Mikael (the Hollow)
 Aiden Flowers as young Klaus Mikaelson
 Alan Heckner as Richard Xavier Dumas
 Ahmed Lucan as Nathaniel
 Chase Vasser as Laurent
 Nathan Parsons as Jackson Kenner

Episodes

Ratings

References 

4
2017 American television seasons